Bruno Arturovich Freindlich (10 October 1909 – 9 July 2002) was a Soviet and Russian actor. People's Artist of the USSR (1974). His daughter Alisa Freindlich is also a notable actress.

Biography

A native of Saint Petersburg and of German ancestry, Bruno Freindlich began his career as an actor performing for audiences of children. For two years he worked at the Bolshoi Theatre of Drama. Since 1948, he was a leading actor of the former Alexandrine Theatre. Among his stage works were Khlestakov in The Government Inspector and Hamlet in Grigori Kozintsev's staging of Shakespeare's play. He played the roles of Peer Gynt, père Goriot, Gayev in The Cherry Orchard, Baron in The Lower Depths. One of the dearest roles of Freindlich, which he played for many years, was the part of writer Ivan Turgenev in the play Elegy. For the role of Guglielmo Marconi in the propaganda film Alexander Popov he won the Stalin Prize (1951).

Death
Freindlich died in Petersburg at the age of 92 and was buried on 11 July 2002 at the Volkovo Cemetery.

Partial filmography

 Alexander Popov (1949) as Guglielmo  Marconi
 Mussorgsky (1950) as César Cui
 Rimsky-Korsakov (1953) as Ramensky
 Belinsky (1953) as Professor Shcheplovidov
 Dirk (1954) as Nikitskiy
 Heroes of Shipka (1955) as Gyula Andrássy
 Twelfth Night (1955) as Feste
 Two Captains (1956) as Ivan Pavlovich Korablyov
 Sofya Kovalevskaya (1956) as Klaus fon Shvedlits
 Don Quixote (1957) as duke
 October Days (1958) as Georgy Polkovnikov
 Fathers and Sons (1959) as Pavel Kirsanov
 Cain XVIII (1963) as Chief of Secret Police
 Two Tickets for a Daytime Picture Show (1967) as Blinov
 Dead Season (1968) as Valery Petrovich
 Thunderstorm over Belaya (1968) as Alexander Kolchak
 Tchaikovsky (1970) as Turgenev
 The Flight (1971) as baron Pyotr Vrangel
 Timur and His Team (1977) as Dr. Kolokolchikov
 A Declaration of Love (1978) as Filippok in old age
 Battle of Moscow (1985, TV Series) as Boris  Shaposhnikov
 The Strange Story of Dr. Jekyll and Mr. Hyde (1986) as Pool
 Stalingrad (1990) as Boris   Shaposhnikov  (final film role)

References

External links

  Biography

1909 births
2002 deaths
Male actors from Saint Petersburg
Russian State Institute of Performing Arts alumni
Honored Artists of the RSFSR
People's Artists of the RSFSR
People's Artists of the USSR
Stalin Prize winners
Recipients of the Order "For Merit to the Fatherland", 4th class
Recipients of the Order of Friendship of Peoples
Recipients of the Order of Honour (Russia)

Recipients of the Order of the Red Banner of Labour
Russian people of German descent
Russian male film actors
Russian male stage actors
Russian male voice actors
Soviet male film actors
Soviet male stage actors
Soviet male voice actors